Philippe Bernard Georges Maurice Massu (18 September 1952 – 13 June 2013) was a sailor from Belle Île, France, who represented his country at the 1984 Summer Olympics in Los Angeles, United States as crew member in the Soling. With helmsman Patrick Haegeli and fellow crew member Michel Audoin they took the 14th place.

References

External links 
 

1952 births
2013 deaths
Sailors at the 1984 Summer Olympics – Soling
Olympic sailors of France
Sportspeople from Morbihan
French male sailors (sport)